Fournier is a French surname. It is a former designation of baker. Prior to the 1900s it was the designation of a firefighter. The firefighter became by default the baker as he was normally in charge of the communal ovens. As fewer people kneaded their own bread, he commenced this task, became more skilled and thus became the baker. 

Notable people with the surname include:

Alain Fournier, computer graphics researcher
Alain-Fournier (Henri-Alban Fournier), French writer
Alphonse Fournier (1893–1961), Canadian politician
Amédée Fournier, French bicycle racer
Ángel Fournier,  Cuban rower (1987–2023)
Catherine Fournier (Canadian politician) (born 1992), Canadian politician
Christophe Fournier, president of the Médecins Sans Frontières organisation
Claude Fournier (1745–1825), a personality of the French Revolution, nicknamed l'Americain
Claude Fournier (1931–2023), filmmaker
Colin Fournier, professor of The Bartlett School of Architecture
Edgar Fournier, Canadian politician
Eduardo Fournier, Chilean football player
Eugène Pierre Nicolas Fournier, French botanist
Evan Fournier (born 1992), French basketball player in the National Basketball Association
Francine Fournier, professional wrestling manager/valet
François Fournier (disambiguation), multiple people
Georges Fournier, French astronomer
Ghislain Fournier, Canadian politician
Guy Fournier (born 1931), author, playwright, and screenwriter
Heraclio Alfaro Fournier (1893–1962), Spanish-born aviator
Henri Laval Fournier (born 1917), WWII Veteran
Hubert Fournier (born 1967), French retired footballer
Jack Fournier (1889–1973), first baseman in Major League Baseball
Jack Fournier (1892–1966), Canadian ice hockey player
Jacques Fournier (1285–1342), Bishop of Pamiers, who became Pope Benedict XII
Jean Alfred Fournier (1832–1914), French dermatologist
Jean-Claude Fournier, French comics artist
Jean-Marc Fournier (born 1959), politician and a lawyer
Joseph Fournier de Belleval (1892–1945), French Canadian baritone
Joseph Michel Fournier (1905–1992), Canadian politician
Laurent Fournier (born 1964), football manager and former midfielder
Michel Fournier (born 1944), French parachutist and adventurer  
Michel Fournier (1945–2008), French cinematographer
Michelle Fournier (born 1977), Canadian hammer thrower
Naipes Heraclio Fournier, founder of Spanish playing card manufacturer Naipes Heraclio Fournier S.A.
Narcisse Fournier (1809–1880), French journalist
Pierre Fournier (1906–1986), French cellist
Pierre Fournier (1949–2022), Canadian French-language comics creator
Pierre Fournier (born 1952), French comics artist who works under the pseudonym Makyo
Pierre Charles Fournier de Saint-Amant, French chess player
Pierre Simon Fournier (1712–1768), French typographer
Rafael Ángel Calderón Fournier (born 1949), President of Costa Rica from 1990 to 1994
Rémi Fournier, French football player
Rift Fournier (1936–2013), American writer, screenwriter and television producer
Robert Fournier-Sarlovèze, French politician and polo player
Ron Fournier, American journalist
Sarto Fournier (1908–1980), Canadian politician
Sébastien Fournier (born 1971), Swiss football player
Stephen Fournier (1852–1919), Canadian politician
Télesphore Fournier (1823–1896), Canadian politician and jurist
Vernel Fournier, jazz drummer
William G. Fournier, Medal of Honor recipient

See also
Fournier (company), Spanish playing card manufacturer
, an Argentine  which disappeared in 1949
Fournier RF 4, one of many aircraft developed by René Fournier
Museo Fournier de Naipes, a playing card museum
Furner (disambiguation)

References

French-language surnames
Occupational surnames